Haibat Khan Niazi was a Pashtun noble and military leader in the Sur Empire. He was the most powerful noble of Sher Shah Suri and Commander of the Niazi contingent of his army. He is best known for bringing law and order in Multan by destroying the power of Balochs and Fetah Khan Jat dominated the entire South Punjab. Sher Shah Suri granted him the title of Azam Hamayun and appointed him governor of the Punjab.

He is a paternal ancestor of Imran Khan, Chairman of Pakistan Tehreek-e-Insaf and former Prime Minister of Pakistan.

Conquest of Kashmir, Multan and Sindh 
Sher Shah Suri ordered Khan to conquer Kashmir, Multan and Sindh in present-day Pakistan. Haibat Khan first conquered Kashmir and installed the Chak dynasty. The conquest of Multan and Sindh and the restoration of law and order was completed by November, 1543.

See also 
 Niazi
 Imran Khan
 Sher Shah Suri
 Khawas Khan Marwat
 Islam Shah Suri

References

External links 
 Early history of Niazi tribe
 Niazi Chiefs in the Mughal empire

Pashtun people
Imran Khan family